Sir Arthur Gore, 2nd Baronet (c. 1685 – 10 February 1742) was an Irish politician and baronet.

He was the son of Paul Gore, himself son of Sir Arthur Gore, 1st Baronet, and his wife Anne Gore, daughter of Sir John Gore. Gore succeeded his grandfather as baronet in 1697. He was Member of Parliament (MP) in the Irish House of Commons. Gore represented Ballynakill from 1703 to 1713 and then for Donegal Borough until 1715. Subsequently, he sat for Mayo until 1741.

Gore was married to Elizabeth Annesley, daughter of Maurice Annesley. They had eight children, four daughters and four sons. Gore was succeeded in the baronetcy by his eldest son Arthur, who later was raised to the Peerage of Ireland as 1st Earl of Arran. Of his daughters, Anne married John Browne, 1st Earl of Altamont and Elizabeth married James Cuffe (died 1762).

References

1685 births
1742 deaths
Baronets in the Baronetage of Ireland
Irish MPs 1703–1713
Irish MPs 1713–1714
Irish MPs 1715–1727
Irish MPs 1727–1760
Politicians from County Mayo
High Sheriffs of Mayo
Arthur
Members of the Parliament of Ireland (pre-1801) for Queen's County constituencies
Members of the Parliament of Ireland (pre-1801) for County Donegal constituencies
Members of the Parliament of Ireland (pre-1801) for County Mayo constituencies